Henry Antoun Barakat (11 June 1914, Cairo – 27 May 1997, Cairo) was a well known Egyptian film director. He was born in Shubra to a Melkite Greek Catholic father of Syro-Lebanese descent, and a Syro-Lebanese mother. His father, Dr. Antoun Barakat, was a physician and received the title of Beik by the King for the services he rendered., He directed some of the most famous films in the Egyptian Cinema.

Filmography

Awards and honors 
2 wins & 3 nominations

Berlin International Film Festival
1959  Nominated Golden Berlin Bear Hassan wa Nayima (1959)
1960  Nominated Golden Berlin Bear Doa al karawan (1959)

Cannes Film Festival 
1965 Nominated Golden Palm El Haram, (1965)

Jakarta Film Festival
1964 Won Best Film Bab el maftuh, El (1964)

Valencia Festival of Mediterranean Cinema 
1984 Won Special Mention Leilet al quabd al Fatma (1984)

Egypt State Incentive Prize in Arts and Letters of the Supreme Council of Culture, 1995.

See also 

Lists of Egyptians
CIFF Top 100 Egyptian films

In the Press 
The best of Egyptian cinema , the 15 best Egyptian films of all time

References
 Armes, Roy. Dictionary of African Filmmakers. Indiana University Press, 11 July 2008. , 9780253000422.

Notes

External links

1914 births
1997 deaths
Film directors from Cairo
Coptic Christians
Egyptian people of Lebanese descent
Egyptian Christians